5468796 Architecture is a Winnipeg-based architecture practice founded in 2007. The practice name incorporates its company registration number.

Background
Johanna Hurme and Sasa Radulovic founded 5468796 Architecture in 2007, and were joined shortly thereafter by Colin Neufeld. The practice promotes a collaborative approach amongst its 20 members, leading a new wave of contemporary architecture in Winnipeg. The firm has been described as "Canada's most exciting new architectural firm in a decade, one dedicated to applying design innovation to the humblest of tasks, a plains-born, good-humoured, resolutely resourceful verve for building modestly, but with elegance." The Houston-based Rice Design Alliance recently stated that they "truly believe 5468796 to be one of the most talented young design firms worldwide."

One of the first projects to gain the firm international recognition was OMS Stage, which is located in Winnipeg's historic Exchange District.

In 2012, 5468796 Architecture and Jae-Sung Chon were selected as Canada's official entry to the 13th International Architecture Exhibition - La Biennale di Venezia for their exhibition, Migrating Landscapes. In 2013, 5468796 Architecture was selected by the Canada Council for the Arts as recipients of the Professional Prix de Rome in Architecture for their travel and research project, Table for 12. As an integral part of practice -  5468796 Architecture established a number of research and engagement platforms to promote design culture and design-related initiatives within a broader community. Johanna Hurme led initiatives including Table for 12 and 1200, Chair Your Idea, and Design Quarter Winnipeg. In 2017, Johanna Hurme chaired The Winnipeg Chamber of Commerce board introducing the Design Driven Economy platform.

In 2019, Johanna Hurme and Sasa Radulovic were named  Morgenstern Visiting Chairs in Architecture at the Illinois Institute of Architecture, Chicago, Illinois. The new position enabled the firm to continue their research into affordable and attainable housing. For the 2022 Spring Semester, Johanna Hurme is a Gensler Visiting Critic at Cornell AAP.

Recognition
Since its founding, the firm's work has been recognized through national and international awards and distinctions including:

Rice Design Alliance Spotlight Prize
Two Time MCHAP.Emerge Finalist
AZURE 10 Projects that Defined the Decade
Canada Council for the Arts Professional Prix de Rome in Architecture
Royal Architectural Institute of Canada Emerging Architectural Practice Award
WAN 21 for 21 Award
Governor General's Award for Architecture (3)
Architectural Review Emerging Architecture Awards (2)
Arthur Erickson Memorial Award
Royal Architectural Institute of Canada Award of Excellence (2)
Architectural Record Design Vanguard,
Progressive Architecture Awards (2)
Canadian Architect Awards of Excellence & Merit (9)
Prairie Design Awards (5)

Selected awards 
2019: Forks Railside MasterPlan - Urban and Architecture Prize Winner 
2019: IW09 - RNDSQR Block - Canadian Architect Award 
2019: Ken Borton - RAIC Young Architect of the Year 
2019: James Avenue Pumping Station - World Architecture Festival Finalist 
2018: Housing Northwestern Arkansas Competition Winner 
Crossroads Garden Shed - Architizer A+ People's Choice Winner 
2018: Parallelogram House - Governor General Award 
2017: One Bucket at a Time - Interior Design BoY Awards 
2017: Parallelogram House - Architectural Review House of the Year Finalist 
2017: Johanna Hurme - Moira Gemmill Prize Shortlist 
2016: OZ Condominiums - MCHAP.Emerge Finalist 
2016: Crossroads Garden Shed - American Architecture Prize Platinum Winner 
2016: Brewery at the Forks: Archmarathon Visioning Category Finalist 
2016: Tweener - Edmonton Infill Competition Winner 
2016: Arthur Residence - World Architecture Festival - Category Winner 
2015: 5468796 - Globe & Mail Canadian Artist of the Year 
2015 Bloc_10 - Premier's Design Award of Excellence 
2015: OMS Stage - Premier's Design Award of Excellence 
2014: Canadian Architect - Award of Excellence, Arthur Residence 
2014: World Architecture Festival - Future Project of the Year, AGGV 
2014: Rice Design Alliance Spotlight Prize 
2014: Mies Crown Hall Americas Prize for Emerging Architecture, OMS Stage [shortlisted] 
2014: Governor General's Medal in Architecture, OMS Stage 
2013: World Architecture News - 21 for 21,
2013: Royal Architectural Institute of Canada - Award of Excellence, Bloc_10 
2013: RAIC Emerging Architectural Practice Award 
2013: Architizer A+ Award, Guertin Boatport 
2013: Heritage Winnipeg Special President's Award, The Avenue on Portage 
2012: Architectural Review - Emerging Architecture Award, Bloc_10 
2012: Prairie Wood Design Awards, Bloc_10 
2012: Governor General's Medal in Architecture, Bloc_10 
2012: Architect Magazine P/A Award, Bond Tower 
2011: Canadian Architect - Award of Merit, Bond Tower 
2011: Canadian Interiors - Best of Canada Award, OMS Stage 
2011: AZ Awards, OMS Stage 
2011: Winnipeg Art Council Awards - Making a Mark Award, 5468796 Architecture 
2011: Royal Architectural Institute of Canada - Award of Excellence, OMS Stage 
2010: Canadian Architect - Award of Excellence, Bloc_10 
2010: Architectural Review - Award for Emerging Architecture, OMS Stage 
2010: Architect Magazine P/A Award, BGBX 
2009: Canadian Architect - Award of Merit, YouCube

Selected projects 
IW09
CY33
Beacon
James Avenue Pumping Station]
One Bucket at a Time
Chair Your Idea 
Parallelogram House
 OZ Condominiums
Canadian Canoe Museum Competition Finalist 
Art Gallery of the Greater Victoria [competition finalist]  
62M 
Bond Tower 
The Avenue on Portage; Winnipeg, MB
 Manitoba Start; Winnipeg, MB 
 Migrating Landscapes; 2012 Venice Biennale in Architecture 
 WRHA on Hargrave; Winnipeg, MB 
 bloc_10; Winnipeg, MB 
 OMS Stage; Winnipeg, MB
 Table for 12
Welcome Place
Centre Village

Sources 
 William Hanley, "The Box Outside", Architectural Record, 2013 
"The Sky's The Limit", Gestalten, 2012  
 Trevor Boddy, "Bloc 10 Housing, Winnipeg, Canada by 5468796", Architectural Review, 2012 
 Alex Bozikovic, "A condo that pushes theory into the built world", Globe & Mail, 2012 
 John Bentley Mays, "Migrating to Venice", Canadian Architect, 2012 
 William Hanley, "What's in a name? A Canadian firm connects its collective identity to its practice and projects", Architectural Record, 2011 
 Terri Fuglem, "Home away from home", Canadian Architect, 2011

References

External links 

 5468796 Architecture (official website)
 Migrating Landscapes (official website)

Architecture firms of Canada